Traveler's Rest was a stopping point of the Lewis and Clark Expedition, located about one mile south of Lolo, Montana. The expedition stopped from September 9 to September 11, 1805, before crossing the Bitterroot Mountains, and again on the return trip from June 30 to July 3, 1806. Traveler's Rest is at the eastern end of the Lolo Trail. It was declared a National Historic Landmark in 1960 and added to the National Register of Historic Places in 1966. The boundaries were subsequently revised, and mostly lie within the  Traveler's Rest State Park, which is operated by the Montana Fish, Wildlife & Parks. Significant archeological findings made in 2002, including latrine sites with traces of mercury and fire hearths, make this the only site on the Lewis and Clark National Historic Trail that has yielded physical proof of the explorers' presence. Records made by Lewis and Clark often spell "Traveler's" as "Traveller's". This spot is largely unchanged from the days of Lewis and Clark. From this location, Lewis and Clark split up to explore Montana during their return trip, not reuniting until they reached Sanish, North Dakota.

At the time of landmark designation in 1960, the exact location of the expedition's campsite was unknown. Boundaries were formalized on December 12, 1983. Subsequent investigations revealed that errors had been made in setting the boundaries of the landmark. Detailed historical and scientific investigations resulted in a 55-page request for boundary corrections, submitted on May 10, 2004, and approved on March 21, 2006. A new road and bridge were built in 2006.

After departing here in 1806, Lewis' part of the expedition traveled to what is now the Alice Creek Historic District.

See also
 List of National Historic Landmarks in Montana
 National Register of Historic Places listings in Missoula County, Montana

References

External links

Travelers' Rest State Park Travelers' Rest Preservation and Heritage Association
Travelers' Rest State Park Montana Fish, Game, & Parks
Travelers' Rest State Park AllTrips: Missoula, Montana
Lewis and Clark Trail site
Old Map of Travelers' Rest area

National Historic Landmarks in Montana
Lewis and Clark Expedition
Protected areas of Missoula County, Montana
History of Missoula, Montana
State parks of Montana
Historic American Engineering Record in Montana
National Register of Historic Places in Missoula County, Montana
1960 establishments in Montana
Protected areas established in 1960